The Araucanian languages  are a small language family of indigenous languages of the Americas spoken in central Chile and neighboring areas of Argentina. The living representatives of this family are Mapudungun (ISO 639-3: arn) and Huilliche (ISO 639-3: huh), spoken respectively by the Mapuche and Huilliche people. These are sometimes considered divergent dialects of a single language isolate.

Demographics
It is estimated that there are approximately 200,000 Mapudungu speakers in Chile and 40,000 speakers in Argentina. Huilliche is the native language of a few thousand Chileans.

Language contact
Jolkesky (2016) notes that there are lexical similarities with the Kunza, Mochika, Uru-Chipaya, Arawak, Pano, Cholon-Hibito, and Kechua language families due to contact.

Internal classification

Mason (1950)
Internal classification of Araucanian languages by Mason (1950):

Araucanian
North
Picunche
Mapuche
Pewenche
Rankel(che)
Moluche
South
Wiliche (Huilliche)
Wiliche
Serrano
Pichi-Wiliche
Manzanero
Veliche (Chilote)
Chikiyami (Cuncho)
Leuvuche
East
Taluhet (Taluche)
Divihet (Diviche)

Jolkesky (2016)
Internal classification by Jolkesky (2016):

(† = extinct)

Mapudungun
Mapudungun, Nuclear
Mapudungun
Pewenche
Rankelche
Mapudungun, Southern: Williche
Mapudungun, Northern
Pikunche †
Chango †

Vocabulary
Loukotka (1968) lists the following basic vocabulary items for Mapuche (Araucanian) language varieties.

Further reading
Augusta, F. J. (1966). Diccionario araucano-español y español-araucano: tomo primero: araucano - español. Padre Las Casas: Impr. y Editorial "San Francisco".
Cañas Pinochet, A. (1911). Estudios de la lengua veliche. In: C. E. Porter (ed.), Trabajos de la III Sección “Ciencias Naturales, Antropo-lógicas y Etnológicas” (Tomo I), 143-330. Santiago de Chile: Imprenta Barcelona.
Erize, E. (1960). Diccionario comentado Mapuche-Español, Araucano, Pehuenche, Pampa, Picunche, Rancülche, Huilliches. Bahía Blanca: Cuadernos del Sur.
Flury, L. (1944). Guiliches: tradiciones, leyendas, apuntes gramaticales y vocabulario de la zona pampa-araucana. (Publicaciones del Instituto de Arqueología, Lingüistica y Folklore Dr. Pablo Cabrera, 8). Córdoba: Universidad de Córdoba
Hernández Sallés, A.; Luna, C. C. (1997). Diccionario ilustrado Mapudungun- Español-Inglés. Santiago de Chile: Pehuén.

References

External links 
Ethnologue, Languages of the World: Araucanian

 
Mapuche language
Language families